Companions of the Order of Canada, the highest level of the Order of Canada, have demonstrated the highest degree of merit to Canada and humanity, on the national or international scene. Up to 15 Companions are appointed each year, with a limit of 165 living Companions at any given time. Companions are entitled to use the post-nominal "CC". As of Sept 19, 2020, there were 136 living Companions (including two honorary). This list shows all of the Companions, in alphabetical order, both living and deceased.

See also

 Canada: A People's History
Heritage Minutes
 List of Canadian awards
List of Canadian Victoria Cross recipients
List of inductees of Canada's Walk of Fame
Persons of National Historic Significance

References

Order of Canada, Companion
Order of Canada